Kanpo may refer to:
 Kanpō (寛保), a Japanese era name for the period spanning the years from 1741 through 1744.
 Kampo (life insurance) (簡保), the life insurance that Japan Post Insurance sells.
 Kanpō or Kampō (漢方) medicine is the Japanese study and adaptation of Traditional Chinese medicine.
 Kanpō (Japanese government gazette) (官報), the Japanese government gazette.